A regional election was held in Madeira on 6 May 2007, to determine the composition of the Legislative Assembly of the Autonomous Region of Madeira. The election was a snap election, as it was original schedule to only happen in October 2008. The election was called after the President of the Regional Government, Alberto João Jardim, resigned after his government clashed with the Socialist Prime Minister José Sócrates due to the new regional finance law approved by the Sócrates government. Jardim defended that the new law was harmful for Madeira's interests. By this time, the Social Democratic Party (PSD) had been in power, nonstop, since 1976.

The election was a huge landslide for the PSD and Alberto João Jardim. He won one of the biggest landslides in Madeira electoral history, winning more than 64% of the votes and 70% of the members of the regional parliament. The PSD won, once again, in all 11 municipalities of the region. The Socialists suffered a huge setback in these elections winning just 15% of the votes and 7 seats, although the number of total members was reduced to 47 due to a new electoral system.

The smaller parties, CDS, CDU and BE, also saw their shares decrease and CDU, led by the Portuguese Communist Party, was able to pull ahead of the People's Party (CDS-PP). The Left Bloc (BE) had, like CDU, minor losses and was able to hold on to their sole seat. But other smaller parties gained representation for the first time. The Earth Party (MPT) and the New Democracy Party (PND) gained, both, one seat and polled above 2%

Turnout in these elections increased very slightly compared with 3 years ago, with 60.8% of voters casting a ballot.

Electoral system
Before this election, members of the regional parliament were elected in 11 constituencies, representing the 11 municipalities of Madeira, that were awarded a determined number of member to elect according with the number of registered voters in those constituencies. The method used to elect the members was the D'Hondt method. For the 2007 elections, the system changed and members of the regional parliament would now be elected by a single constituency, coinciding with the territory of the Region. The method used, to elect members, would continue to be the D'Hondt method. The total number of members was also reduced from the 68, in the 2004 elections, to 47 in the 2007 elections.

Parties
The parties that partook in the election, and their leaders, were:

 Left Bloc (BE), Paulo Martinho Martins
 Unitary Democratic Coalition (CDU), Edgar Silva
 Earth Party (MPT), João Gonçalves
 New Democracy Party (PND), Baltasar de Carvalho Machado Gonçalves de Aguiar 
 Socialist Party (PS), Jacinto Serrão de Freitas
 Social Democratic Party (PSD), Alberto João Jardim
 People's Party (CDS–PP), José Manuel Rodrigues

Opinion polling

Summary of votes and seats

|-
! rowspan="2" colspan=2 style="background-color:#E9E9E9" align=left|Parties
! rowspan="2" style="background-color:#E9E9E9" align=right|Votes
! rowspan="2" style="background-color:#E9E9E9" align=right|%
! rowspan="2" style="background-color:#E9E9E9" align=right|±pp swing
! colspan="5" style="background-color:#E9E9E9" align="center"|MPs
! rowspan="2" style="background-color:#E9E9E9;text-align:right;" |MPs %/votes %
|- style="background-color:#E9E9E9"
! style="background-color:#E9E9E9;text-align=center|2004
! style="background-color:#E9E9E9;text-align=center|2007
! style="background-color:#E9E9E9" align=right|±
! style="background-color:#E9E9E9" align=right|%
! style="background-color:#E9E9E9" align=right|±
|-
| 
|90,377||64.24||10.5||44||33||11||70.21||5.5||1.09
|-
| 
|21,692||15.42||12.0||19||7||12||14.89||13.0||0.97
|-
| 
|7,650||5.44||0.1||2||2||0||4.26||1.3||0.78
|-
| 
|7,519||5.34||1.7||2||2||0||4.26||1.3||0.80
|-
| 
|4,186||2.98||0.7||1||1||0||2.13||0.7||0.71
|-
| 
|3,175||2.26||||||1||||2.13||||0.94
|-
|style="width: 10px" bgcolor=#1F468B align="center" | 
|align=left|New Democracy
|2,931||2.08||||||1||||2.13||||1.02
|-
|colspan=2 align=left style="background-color:#E9E9E9"|Total valid
|width="50" align="right" style="background-color:#E9E9E9"|137,530
|width="40" align="right" style="background-color:#E9E9E9"|97.75
|width="40" align="right" style="background-color:#E9E9E9"|0.4
|width="40" align="right" style="background-color:#E9E9E9"|68
|width="40" align="right" style="background-color:#E9E9E9"|47
|width="40" align="right" style="background-color:#E9E9E9"|21
|width="40" align="right" style="background-color:#E9E9E9"|100.00
|width="40" align="right" style="background-color:#E9E9E9"|0.0
|width="40" align="right" style="background-color:#E9E9E9"|—
|-
|colspan=2|Blank ballots
|1,148||0.82||0.2||colspan=6 rowspan=4|
|-
|colspan=2|Invalid ballots
|2,019||1.43||0.2
|-
|colspan=2 align=left style="background-color:#E9E9E9"|Total
|width="50" align="right" style="background-color:#E9E9E9"|140,697
|width="40" align="right" style="background-color:#E9E9E9"|100.00
|width="40" align="right" style="background-color:#E9E9E9"|
|-
|colspan=2|Registered voters/turnout
||231,606||60.75||0.3
|-
| colspan=11 align=left | Source: Comissão Nacional de Eleições
|}

See also
Madeira

References

External links
Official results page for the 2007 Madeira election
Election results
Comissão Nacional de Eleições

2007 elections in Portugal
2007 in Portugal
2007